Events in the year 1657 in Norway.

Incumbents
Monarch: Frederick III

Events

June 5 – The Dano-Swedish War (1657–58), in Norway called Krabbekrigen (named after Iver Krabbe) starts.
Oppland Regiment is formed.
Ulefos Jernværk is established.

Arts and literature

Births

Deaths

See also

References